The M.B. Quivey House is a historic two-and-a-half-story house in Mitchell, Nebraska. It was built in 1914 for Maurice B. Quivey, a businessman from Hamlin, New York who co-founded the Mitchell Mercantile Company with F. M. Raymond in 1905. The house was designed in "a vernacular interpretation of the Prairie School style of architecture" by architect J. W. Hall. It was acquired by Harold Coleman in 1946 and remodelled into apartments. It has been listed on the National Register of Historic Places since March 24, 1983.

References

1914 establishments in Nebraska
Houses completed in 1914
Houses on the National Register of Historic Places in Nebraska
National Register of Historic Places in Scotts Bluff County, Nebraska
Prairie School architecture in Nebraska